The Stiff Gins are an Indigenous Australian band from Sydney. They call their music "acoustic with harmonies" and are regularly compared to Tiddas. The band was formed by Emma Donovan, Nardi Simpson and Kaleena Briggs in 1999, after meeting at the Eora Centre while studying music. The band's name uses the word gin (a derogatory word for an Aboriginal woman which was also a Dharug word for woman/wife) with the word stiff to become strong black woman, a name which caused debate about use of the word gin.

The band won Deadlys in 2000 for Most Promising New Talent and in 2001 for their single "Morning Star".

Discography

Albums

Extended plays

Awards

Deadly Awards
The Deadly Awards, commonly known simply as "The Deadlys", was an annual celebration of Australian Aboriginal and Torres Strait Islander achievement in music, sport, entertainment and community. The awards ran from 1995 until funding cuts lead to their cancellation in 2014.

|-
| Deadly Awards 2000
| Stiff Gins
| Most Promising New Talent
| 
|-
| Deadly Awards 2001
| "Morning Star" by Stiff Gins
| Best Single Release
| 
|-

References

Further reading

External links
 Stiff Gins at Acoustica Festival
 review at Folk Australia
 review at Message Stick Online
 Stiff Gins on Living Black

Musical groups established in 1999
Indigenous Australian musical groups
Musical groups from Sydney